Mahalo From Elvis is a compilation album by American singer and musician Elvis Presley, released posthumously in 1978.

Content
Side one consists of five previously unissued tracks Presley recorded in Honolulu on January 14, 1973 for inclusion in the U.S.-version of the live concert TV special Aloha from Hawaii (these tracks were, in fact, recorded after the conclusion of the concert, with no audience present, therefore they are not considered truly "live" recordings). The recording of No More, however, was not used in the special. All songs on side two were previously issued recordings originating from various Presley movie soundtracks from the 1960s. The album was issued by Pickwick Records by arrangement with RCA Records, who leased Pickwick the rights to reissue certain recordings by Presley and other RCA recording artists, most of which were previously issued on the budget label, RCA Camden. This album had been assembled by RCA in late 1973 and was slated to be released on the RCA Camden label, but was not issued at that time. The UK version was titled The King and featured completed different artwork. In 1991, the album was reissued on compact disc on the RCA Camden label. Mahalo from Elvis was certified Gold on September 15, 2011 by the RIAA.

Track listing

Elvis Presley compilation albums
1978 compilation albums
Pickwick Records compilation albums
Compilation albums published posthumously